Lincoln County School District #2 is a public school district based in Afton, Wyoming, United States.

Geography
Lincoln County School District #2 serves the western portion of Lincoln County, including the following communities:

Incorporated places
Town of Afton
Town of Alpine
Town of Cokeville
Town of Star Valley Ranch
Town of Thayne
Census-designated places (Note: All census-designated places are unincorporated.)
Alpine Northeast
Alpine Northwest
Auburn
Bedford
Etna
Fairview
Grover
Smoot
Taylor
Turnerville
Unincorporated places
Freedom

Schools

Secondary schools
Grades 9-12
Star Valley High School
Swift Creek High School (Alternative)
Grades 7-12
Cokeville High School
Grades 7-8
Star Valley Middle School

Elementary schools
Grades 4-6
Etna Elementary School
Osmond Elementary School
Grades K-6
Cokeville Elementary School
Grades K-3
Afton Elementary School
Thayne Elementary School

Student demographics
The following figures are as of October 1, 2009.

Total District Enrollment: 2,640
Student enrollment by gender
Male: 1,396 (52.88%)
Female: 1,244 (47.12%)
Student enrollment by ethnicity
White: 2,474 (93.71%)
Hispanic or Latino: 107 (4.05%)
American Indian or Alaska Native: 16 (0.61%)
Black or African American: 11 (0.42%)
Asian: 7 (0.27%)
Native Hawaiian or Other Pacific Islander: 4 (0.15%)
Two or More Races: 21 (0.80%)

See also
List of school districts in Wyoming

References

External links
Lincoln County School District #2 – official site.

Education in Lincoln County, Wyoming
School districts in Wyoming